Luigi Vaccaro (born 26 March 1991) is a Belgian footballer who currently plays for FC Wiltz 71 in the Luxembourg National Division.

References

External links

1991 births
Living people
Footballers from Liège
Association football defenders
Belgian footballers
K.A.S. Eupen players
C.S. Visé players
R.F.C. Seraing (1922) players
Royal Excel Mouscron players
R.E. Virton players
Belgian Pro League players
Belgian expatriate footballers
Expatriate footballers in Luxembourg
Belgian expatriate sportspeople in Luxembourg
Belgian people of Italian descent